Marko Brkić (born July 25, 1982) is a Serbian former professional basketball player. He is a 2.06 m (6 ft 9in) tall power forward.

External links
 Eurobasket profile
 Marko Brkić at aba-liga.com

1982 births
Living people
ABA League players
Basketball players from Belgrade
KK Hemofarm players
KK Igokea players
KK Radnički Kragujevac (2009–2014) players
KK Sloga players
KK Włocławek players
OKK Beograd players
BC Balkan Botevgrad players
Power forwards (basketball)
Serbian men's basketball players
Serbian expatriate basketball people in Bosnia and Herzegovina
Serbian expatriate basketball people in Bulgaria
Serbian expatriate basketball people in Hungary
Serbian expatriate basketball people in Poland
Szolnoki Olaj KK players
Turów Zgorzelec players